Mihajlo "Mićo" Ljubibratić (1839 – 26 February 1889) was a Serbian voivode (military commander), Orthodox priest, writer and translator that participated in the many uprisings in the Herzegovina region. He was the first person in the Balkans to translate the Quran into Serbian. Greek, Bulgarian, Romanian and Albanian translations would follow in the 20th century.

Life

Mihajlo Ljubibratić was born in Ljubovo, Trebinje (modern Bosnia and Herzegovina). In the Herzegovinian Uprising (1857–1862), he joined Luka Vukalović. He supported Garibaldi in the Italian revolution. After the fall of the uprising (1862), he goes to Serbia where he continues organizing the liberation of Balkan peoples, also seeking to add Slavic Muslims in the bands. In the Herzegovina Uprising (1875-1878), the Serbian government, which dare not to publicly assist because of international pressure, secretly sends Ljubibratić among others to lead the uprising. In March 1876, he fights in Bosnia, but is captured and interrogated by the Austrians. In March 1877, he returns to Serbia, and upon the Herzegovina-Boka Uprising (1882), he devotes himself to establish an administrative body and the cooperation of Serbs and Muslims (i.e. Bosniaks) against the Austro-Hungarians.

See also
Stevan Šupljikac, voivode in Austrian service, the first Duke of Serbian Vojvodina (1848)

References

Sources
 Vojna enciklopedija, Belgrade 1973, book five, page 163

1839 births
1889 deaths
People from Trebinje
Serbs of Bosnia and Herzegovina
19th-century Serbian people
Serbian military leaders
Serbian revolutionaries
Armed priests
Quran translators
19th-century translators